Kalusukovalani is a 2002 Indian Telugu-language romantic comedy film directed by R. Raghuraj and written by Vakkantham Vamsi. The film stars Uday Kiran, Gajala and Prathyusha. The film also marks Prathyusha's final film, just before her untimely demise; she died exactly two weeks, after the film's release. Kalusukovalani was an average grosser at the box-office. The film was remade by Raghuraj in Tamil as Ice (2003).

Plot
Ravi (Uday Kiran), a strong headed young man gets an opportunity to travel to Switzerland after meeting Viswanatham (Satyanarayana)  and becomes the general manager of Vishwanathan's business. He meets Anjali (Gajala) there and falls in love, however fate splits them apart. Back in India he becomes the head of Vishwanathan's entire business. The rest of the film is about the issues he faces and whether he succeeds in his love.

Cast 
 Uday Kiran as Ravi
 Gajala as Anjali
 Prathyusha as Madhavi
 Sunil as Acchi
 Kaikala Satyanarayana as Vishwanatham
 Dharmavarapu Subramanyam
 Giri Babu
 Vizag Prasad as Anjali's father
 Gautam Raju
 Ananth
 Jr. Relangi
 Sudha

Soundtrack 
The music was composed by Devi Sri Prasad and released by Aditya Music.

Reception 
Jeevi of Idlebrain.com wrote that "Over all, Kalusukovalani is an average fare". A critic from Sify called the film "Half Baked".

References 

2002 films
2000s Telugu-language films
2002 romantic comedy films
Indian romantic comedy films
Films scored by Devi Sri Prasad
Telugu films remade in other languages